Ithoria was a town of ancient Aetolia, near the Achelous River, and a short distance south of Conope. It was situated at the entrance of a pass, and was strongly fortified both by nature and by art. It was taken by Philip V of Macedon and levelled to the ground in 219 BCE.

Its site is located near the modern Agios Ilias.

References

Populated places in ancient Aetolia
Former populated places in Greece